Vishnupadas are songs in praise of Vishnu/God or of his popular avatars, Krishna/Rama.

References

Chants
Hindu music